Reverend Professor Joshua Owusu-Sekyere is a Ghanaian academic and an Agricultural engineer. He is the current rector of the Perez University College.

References

Year of birth missing (living people)
Living people
Academic staff of Perez University College
Ghanaian engineers